Lolë is an athletic apparel designer and retailer based in Montreal, Quebec,  Canada. The company was founded in 2002 by Bernard Mariette, and currently operates 50 stores in seven countries. In June 2018, the company announced an expansion into men's athletic apparel. The company is also in the process of opening a Los Angeles head office for its United States business.

References 

Shops in Montreal
Companies based in Montreal
Canadian companies established in 2002
Clothing companies established in 2002
Retail companies established in 2002
Clothing retailers of Canada
2002 establishments in Quebec